Suart is a surname. Notable people with the surname include:

Bob Suart (1882–1918), English footballer
Evelyn Suart (1881–1950), English pianist
Hesdey Suart (1986–), Dutch footballer
Richard Suart (1951–), English opera singer and actor
Ron Suart (1920–2015), English footballer and manager
Wendy Law Suart (1926–2012), Australian travel writer